Pterolophia bigibbera is a species of beetle in the family Cerambycidae. It was described by Newman in 1842. It is known from the Philippines, Japan, and Taiwan.

References

bigibbera
Beetles described in 1842